Results of the 1994 Sri Lankan general election by province.

Number of votes

1. The EROS/PLOTE/TELO alliance contested as TELO in Ampara District, Batticaloa District, Colombo District and Trincomalee District; as DPLF in Vanni District; and as in an independent group in Jaffna District.
2. UCPF contested as an independent group in Nuwara Eliya District.
3. EPDP contested as an independent group in Jaffna District.

Percentage of votes

1. The EROS/PLOTE/TELO alliance contested as TELO in Ampara District, Batticaloa District, Colombo District and Trincomalee District; as DPLF in Vanni District; and as in an independent group in Jaffna District.
2. UCPF contested as an independent group in Nuwara Eliya District.
3. EPDP contested as an independent group in Jaffna District.

Seats

1. The EROS/PLOTE/TELO alliance contested as TELO in Ampara District, Batticaloa District, Colombo District and Trincomalee District; as DPLF in Vanni District; and as in an independent group in Jaffna District.
2. UCPF contested as an independent group in Nuwara Eliya District.
3. EPDP contested as an independent group in Jaffna District.

See also
 Results of the 1994 Sri Lankan general election by electoral district

References
 

1994 Sri Lankan parliamentary election
Election results in Sri Lanka